George Matson (5 December 1817 – 22 July 1898) was an Australian cricketer. He played two first-class matches for Tasmania between 1853 and 1858.

See also
 List of Tasmanian representative cricketers

References

External links
 

1817 births
1898 deaths
Australian cricketers
Tasmania cricketers
People from Rochester, Kent
Sportspeople from Kent